Dil Hai Hindustani is an Indian Hindi reality singing talent show, which was scheduled to premiere sometime in December  2016 and has been broadcast on Star Plus. The series aired on weekends' nights. The series is produced by Frames Production of Ranjeet Thakur and Hemant Ruprell. The uniqueness about this show is that it allows competitors, not from only India, but from all over the world to compete. The winner of  first Season  was Haitham Mohammed Rafi and the  winner of Second season is Akshay Dhawan.

Plot
Budding singers from any age group will be given a chance to sign up for it.

Top 5 (Finalist's)
Winners of Dil Hai Hindustani 1

Winners of Dil Hai Hindustani 2

Winner

The Winner Of season 1 Is  From Oman And Runner Up Is Euphony Official And Barnali Hota. The Winner of second season is Akshay Dhawan and runner up is

References

External links
 Dil Hai Hindustani Steaming on Hotstar
 

2016 Indian television series debuts
Hindi-language television shows
Indian reality television series
Music competitions in India
Frames Production series
Singing talent shows
Television shows set in Mumbai
StarPlus original programming
Indian music television series